Sir John Ogilvy, 9th Baronet (17 March 1803 – 9 March 1890) was a Scottish Liberal Party politician who was MP for Dundee from 1857 to 1874.

Origins
Ogilvy was born at 60 George Street in Edinburgh on 17 March 1803, eldest of the nine children of Rear Admiral (R. N.) Sir William Ogilvy, 8th Baronet (1758/58–1823), and his wife, Sarah Morley (Lady Ogilvy). He was educated at Harrow School and Christ Church, Oxford where he matriculated on 5 November 1821. He succeeded to the family baronetcy on the death of his father in 1823.

Career

With his wife Lady Jane Ogilvy, he was largely responsible for the foundation of Baldovan Institute in 1852, Scotland's first residential hospital for learning disabled children. He was closely involved, along with Dr James Arrott, the head physician, in the moving of Dundee Royal Infirmary to a new site, and played a prominent part in the laying of the foundation stone for the new building on 22 July 1852. He also established the Dundee Corn Exchange in 1856.

He made an unsuccessful attempt to represent Montrose in parliament when a by-election was called there in 1855. He had better luck in the general election two years later, when he was elected to represent Dundee.

Ogilvy was MP for Dundee from 1857 to 1874, originally as its sole member, but from 1868 was one of two members representing the town after it became a two-member constituency. He was first elected at the general election of 1857, defeating his future colleague George Armitstead, by 245 votes. In both 1859 and 1865 he was returned unopposed. In the first election for the new two member seat in 1868 he was elected in second place, finishing 77 votes behind Armitstead, but polling over 3,000 votes more than third placed candidate.

Marriage and progeny

Ogilvy married twice. On 7 July 1831 he married Juliana Barbara, the youngest daughter of Lord Henry Howard-Molyneux-Howard, at St George's Hanover Square. The couple had two children before Lady Juliana's death on :

 Reginald Howard Alexander Ogilvy (1832–1910), 10th Baronet
 Juliana Ogilvy, married Sir Nelson Rycroft, 4th Baronet

Ogilvy remarried on 5 April 1836, to Jane Elizabeth Howard, daughter of Thomas Howard, 16th Earl of Suffolk, in Charlton, Wiltshire. The couple had five children:

 Henry Thomas Ogilvy (1837–1909), Barrister, known as Henry Thomas Nisbet Hamilton Ogilvy after his marriage.
 Charles William Norman Ogilvy (1839–1903), Rector of Hanbury, Worcestershire
 Fanny Henrietta Ogilvy
 Edith Isabel Ogilvy
 Eveline Constance Maud Ogilvy

Death and memorials
He was succeeded by his eldest son, Sir Reginald Ogilvy, who died in 1910.

His death was marked by a memorial poem by William McGonagall.

References

External links 
 

1803 births
1890 deaths
Baronets in the Baronetage of Nova Scotia
Scottish Liberal Party MPs
Members of the Parliament of the United Kingdom for Dundee constituencies
UK MPs 1857–1859
UK MPs 1859–1865
UK MPs 1865–1868
UK MPs 1868–1874
People from Dundee
People educated at Harrow School
Alumni of Christ Church, Oxford
Members of the Royal Company of Archers
Scottish Freemasons